Sweet and sour is a generic term that encompasses many styles of sauce, cuisine and cooking methods. It is commonly used in East Asia and Southeast Asia, and has been used in England since the Middle Ages. Sweet and sour sauce remains popular in Asian and Western cuisines.

By region

East Asia

Chinese cuisine

Sweet and sour dishes, sauces, and cooking methods have a long history in China. One of the earliest recordings of sweet and sour comes from《燒尾宴食單》, a menu of the food served in Tang Dynasty (618-907) festivals written in 708. It included many sweet and sour dishes and recorded that they were invented by Chancellor Wei Juyuan under Emperor Zhongzong of Tang when he hosted the Emperor at his house; one of them is the iconic Chinese dish sweet and sour spare ribs. Some authors say that the original sweet and sour sauce came from the Chinese province of Henan, but the sauce in this area is a light vinegar and sugar mixture not resembling what most people, including the Chinese, would call sweet and sour. Many places in China use a sweet and sour sauce as a dipping sauce for fish and meat, rather than in cooking as is commonly found in  westernized Chinese cuisine.

This style of using sauces is popular amongst Chinese who tie certain sauces to particular meats such as chili and soy for shrimp and vinegar and garlic for goose. There are, however, some dishes, such as the Cantonese sweet and sour pork or loong har kow (sweet and sour lobster balls), in which the meat is cooked and a sauce added to the wok before serving.

Not all dishes are cooked; some, such as "sweet and sour fruit and vegetable" salad from the eastern regions of China, also find their way in Chinese cuisine. This dish combines salad vegetables such as cucumber, tomato, bell pepper, and onion with a mixture of pineapple (or pear), vinegar, and sugar to make a cold served dish.

In China traditionally the sauces are made from mixing sugar or honey with a sour liquid such as rice vinegar, soy sauce, and spices such as ginger and cloves. Sometimes a paste made from tomatoes is used but this is rare and normally restricted to Western cooking.

Cantonese sweet and sour sauce is the direct ancestor of the sauce of the same name in the West, and was originally developed for sweet and sour pork.  The late renowned chef from Hong Kong Leung King included the following as his sweet and sour source sauce recipe: white rice vinegar, salt, Chinese brown candy, ketchup, Worcestershire sauce, and dark soy sauce. Hong Kong's gourmet Willie Mark Yiu-Tong (better known as Wei Ling|唯靈), himself a long-time friend of Leung, suggests to contemporary eateries not to resort to cheap bulk manufactured versions of vinegar, ketchup, and Worcestershire sauce, or the sauce will risk being too sharp in taste and might break the balance of flavours. He suggests the more acidic white rice vinegar could be replaced with apple cider vinegar, and ketchup and Worcestershire sauce should be of renowned gourmet brands.

Hong Kong/Cantonese

The original Cantonese sweet and sour pork is made with vinegar, preserved plums and hawthorn candy for an almost scarlet colour and sweet-sour taste. A related Hong Kong/Cantonese-based dish is sweet and sour spare-ribs and it is identical in methods except spare-ribs are used in place of pork loins.

Guo bao rou

Guo bao rou is a classic dish from Northeast China (Dongbei), originating in Harbin, Heilongjiang Province. It consists of large thinly sliced pieces of pork tenderloin in potato starch batter, deep-fried twice until crispy. They are then lightly coated in a variation of a sweet and sour sauce, made from freshly prepared syrup and rice vinegar, flavoured with ginger and garlic. The batter absorbs the sauce and softens. A Beijing variant has the sauce thin and watery, while the dish as prepared in Liaoning Province is often a thicker sauce with ketchup (tomato sauce) added to it. However, the true or original version of guō bāo ròu served in Harbin, Heilongjiang Province, is made with an amber-coloured sauce due to the fact that it uses caramelized sugar.

Squirrel-shaped Mandarin fish

Originating in Suzhou, Jiangsu province, the squirrel-shaped Mandarin fish has a crisp skin but soft centre. The fish body of Siniperca chuatsi is scored such that it fans out when cooked, similar in appearance to a bushy squirrel tail. The fish is served with a sweet and sour sauce drizzled on top and garnished with a little shrimp meat and dried bamboo shoots.

Sweet and sour Yellow River carp
A speciality of Shandong province, in particular the city of Jinan, the Yellow River carp is prepared by making diagonal slices partway through its flesh. It is next coated in corn flour then deep fried causing the fish to curl and the slices to open out. Finally a sweet and sour sauce is poured over the cooked fish. This is one of the distinctive dishes typical of Lu Cuisine.

Sweet and sour spare ribs

A popular dish in Shanghai cuisine, sweet and sour spare ribs are made using pork ribs that are lightly coated in corn starch and seasoned before being fried and served in a sweet and sour sauce.

Korean cuisine 

In South Korea, a sweet and sour meat dish known as tangsuyuk is one of the most popular Korean Chinese dishes. Made with either pork or beef, the bite-sized pieces are usually coated with potato/sweet potato starch/corn starch or glutinous rice flour, and double-fried in oil. The dish is served with sweet and sour sauce, typically made by boiling vinegar, sugar, and water, with variety of fruits and vegetables like carrot, cucumber, onion, wood ear mushroom, and pineapple. Starch slurry is used to thicken the sauce.

Europe

English cuisine
Sweet and sour sauces have been used in English cuisine since the Middle Ages, with recipes for sweet and sour meat and fish in the 1390 cookery book The Forme of Cury.

French cuisine

In French cuisine, a sweet and sour sauce base made from sugar and vinegar is a gastrique. "Aigre-doux" is a sweet and sour sauce in general.

Italian cuisine

Agrodolce  is a traditional sweet and sour sauce in Italian cuisine. Its name comes from "agro" (sour) and "dolce" (sweet). Agrodolce is made by reducing sour and sweet elements, traditionally vinegar and sugar. Sometimes, additional flavorings are added, such as wine, fruit, or even chocolate. One recipe for lamb agrodolce is served over rigatoni or wide noodles, such as pappardelle.

Southeast Asia

Filipino cuisine

In Filipino cuisine, sweet and sour sauces are known as agre dulce or Filipino sweet and sour sauce. It is made by mixing cornstarch with water, salt, sugar, and a tangy ingredient; typically tomato ketchup, banana ketchup, or pineapples. The mixture is brought to a boil then simmered until it thickens. Labuyo chilis may also be added. The name means "sour-sweet" in Philippine Spanish, from Spanish agrio ("sour") and dulce ("sweet"). It is also known as agri dulci in Chavacano and can refer to dishes cooked with the sauce. Agre dulce is commonly used as a dipping sauce for appetizers like lumpia or okoy.

Fusion cuisine 

Sweet and sour chicken is a dish frequently served in Chinese restaurants in various countries in Oceania, Europe, North America and South America, and is available at some restaurants in East Asia and Southeast Asia in an essentially identical version. The dish generally comprises cubes of white meat chicken deep-fried in batter and served with sweet and sour sauce. Sometimes it is topped with pineapple, green pepper, carrot, or sweet pickles.

Sweet and sour pork is a Chinese dish particularly popular in westernised Cantonese cuisine and may be found all over the world. Several provinces in China produce various dishes that claim to be the ancestor including a traditional Jiangsu dish called Pork in a sugar and vinegar sauce (糖醋里脊; pinyin: táng cù lǐjǐ).

The dish consists of deep fried pork in bite sized pieces, and subsequently stir-fried in a more customized version of sweet and sour sauce made of sugar, ketchup, white vinegar, and soy sauce, and additional ingredients including pineapple, green pepper (capsicum), and onion. In more elaborate preparations, the dish's tartness is controlled by requiring that Chinese white rice vinegar be used sparingly and using ketchups with less vinegary tastes, while some restaurants use unripe kiwifruits and HP sauce in place of vinegar. 

Western cultures use sweet and sour sauce in two different ways. Dishes can either include the sauce as an ingredient in cooking or use the sauce as a pour-over or dipping sauce for the meal.

Chinese restaurants in Western countries commonly serve chicken, pork, or shrimp that has been battered and deep-fried, then served with a sweet and sour sauce poured over the meat. It is also common to find the sweet and sour sauce cooked with sliced green peppers, onions and pineapple before it is poured over the meat.

Many western dishes involve cooking the meat with a variety of ingredients to make a complete sweet and sour dish in the manner of the Gu lo yuk. The most popular dishes are those of  pork and shrimp.  In French cuisine, it has been developed contrary to traditional French cooking practices and preparation of sweet and sour sauce (Aigre-douce) often involves immersing the food in a plentiful amount of sauce.

Common in Western sweet and sour sauce is the addition of fruits such as pineapple and vegetables such as sweet pepper and green onions. Traditional rice vinegar is becoming more readily available due to the increase in Asian food stores but a mixture of vinegar and dry sherry is often still used in sweet and sour dishes. Also common is the use of corn starch as thickener for the sauce and tomato ketchup to give a stronger red colour to the dish and to add a Western taste. Most supermarkets across Europe and North America carry a range of prepared sweet and sour sauces either for adding to a stir-fry or for use as a dipping sauce.

Primarily in North America, sweet and sour sauce is available in small plastic packets or containers at Chinese take-out establishments for use as a dipping sauce.

In Britain, Thai-style sweet chilli dipping sauce has recently overtaken the previous popularity of Chinese-style sweet-sour sauce to the extent it can often be found at non-Asian establishments for a wide variety of western-style snacks from fishcakes to chips and seafood such as calamari and prawns.

A number of variations are used in barbecue cuisine, either home-made or prepared from a number of common brands.

Besides American Chinese restaurants, popular fast food restaurants such as McDonald's, Burger King, and Wendy's carry their own proprietary brands of sweet and sour sauce packets. These are commonly offered and used as a dipping sauce for chicken fingers and chicken nuggets.

See also

 Acetomel
 Agre dulce
 Gastrique
 Duck sauce
 Hoisin sauce
 List of dips
 List of Chinese sauces
 List of Italian dishes
 List of sauces
 Lychee pork
 Palapa
 Plum sauce
 Rainbow sauce
 Reduction (cooking)
 Sweet chili sauce
 Vincotto
 Vinegar

References

External links

 General sauce recipes
 Sweet and Sour Recipe

American Chinese cuisine
British cuisine
Chinese cuisine
Chinese sauces